The World Club Challenge is an annual rugby league competition between the winners of the Australasian National Rugby League (NRL) and the European Super League, for the de facto club world championship of the sport. The first such match was played in 1976 but did not become a regular fixture until the late 1980s. It was also punctuated in the 1990s by the Super League war but has been held every year since 2000. St Helens are the current champions, defeating Penrith Panthers 13–12 in 2023.

Between 2015 and 2017, the World Club Challenge became the championship match for the 3 game, World Club Series. Two further exhibition matches were played prior to the main game.

As the World Club Challenge in its current form is a match between the winners of the NRL and Super League competitions, it is currently possible for teams from the five countries with professional sides to qualify: New Zealand, France, Wales, England, and Australia. As of the completion of the 2020 edition of the event, only English and Australian sides have competed so far.

History

1976–1999: Origin and development
The competition began unofficially in 1976 as a match between Sydney's Eastern Suburbs and Premiership winners St. Helens. This inaugural clash was proposed as merely a 'one-off' game, and was played at the Sydney Cricket Ground on June 29, in the midst of the 1976 NSWRFL season.

While some considered it an unnecessary disruption to both teams' campaigns in their respective domestic competitions, a healthy crowd of 26,856 turned out for the match, indicating that it was indeed a viable initiative. Leading into the match, St. Helens opted to play two warm-up games against a Queensland and Auckland representative team respectively, and lost both. In order to prove their triumph was legitimate, and not a result of fatigue on behalf of St. Helens, Eastern Suburbs challenged both representative sides who had defeated St. Helens. While Queensland declined the offer, Auckland eagerly accepted, and were ultimately defeated by the tricolours 26–22 in front of an enthusiastic home crowd. Because the 1976 clash was a standalone game, there were no immediate plans for a follow up match the next season, or indeed any in the foreseeable future.

The concept would not return until 1987, when another unofficial match took place. Wigan chairman Maurice Lindsay invited Manly-Warringah to Central Park. Long-serving Manly secretary Ken Arthurson proposed that the prize money should be split between the two clubs, regardless of the outcome, however, Lindsay argued that the game should be played under a 'winner-takes-all' stipulation, believing that it would result in the players and fans taking the game more seriously. Played on a dry October night, the match between Manly and Wigan was a tough, at times spiteful, encounter which attracted 36,895 spectators to Wigan's Central Park, most of whom spilled onto the ground at fulltime in celebration of the home side's 8–2 victory. Manly forward Ron Gibbs became the first player to be sent off in a World Club Challenge game during the match, as he was given his marching orders following an illegal elbow to Wigan centre Joe Lydon as he attempted a drop-goal.

Sea Eagles captain Paul Vautin would later claim that his side's loss came down to the team's lackadaisical attitude toward the game, saying that Manly treated the fixture as an opportunity to travel to England for a holiday, where they would continue their grand final celebrations.

The first officially recognised World Club Challenge was between Widnes and Canberra in 1989. Three more World Club Challenge games were played in the 1990s – 1991, 1992 and 1994 – with Wigan appearing in all three (winning the first two, before losing to the Broncos in the latter).  After the 1994 match logistical issues meant the concept was put on hiatus until it was revived in 1997.

With the outbreak of Australia's Super League War in 1995, the World Club Challenge was not staged again until 1997 when the competition was restructured to include the twenty-two clubs from the Australasian Super League and the European Super League. The twelve Australian Rugby League affiliated clubs did not take part. With six rounds in two hemispheres and $1,000,000 prize money, the competition was prohibitively expensive to stage and reportedly lost over $5,000,000. This, coupled with the poor ratings and attendances both in Australia and Europe, led to the competition being postponed for two seasons.

Returning to a one-off match between the League champions in 1998, a World Club Challenge as a show-piece fixture at Ellis Park in Johannesburg was mooted. However this did not eventuate.

2000–2014: Regular competition
When it was resurrected in 2000, the World Club Challenge was once more played between the winners of the premierships in Australasia and Europe. During this period it was contested annually in the United Kingdom in late January or early February, before the commencement National Rugby League season and the Super League season. Over this period Super League teams dominated the tournament winning 7 of 9 matches, and this led one Australian commentator to deride the competition, citing the British refusal to play the game outside of the UK, the effects of jet lag on an Australian team who arrived in England only a couple of days before the game, and wintry conditions as reasons for Australian team's poor performance. In addition, the games were being played at the beginning of the new season instead of at the end of the previous season, so the rosters of both sides had normally changed considerably, therefore the teams that took the field were not the ones that won the respective premierships. For these reasons, it was viewed as merely a pre-season warm up game by most Australasian teams and fans.

Since the 2009 tournament, its popularity has increased with stronger crowds and also with Australian teams taking the concept more seriously, Australian teams were arriving earlier to acclimatize the players and often organising warm up games with other super league sides and this created a much stronger showing and improved results. This also led to an increased movement to having the tournament staged in Australia. During this period, the matches were fixtured in late February, still before the commencement of the National Rugby League season but in the early stages of the new Super League season.

In mid-2012, a working party was established to look into the feasibility of conducting the match in either a neutral or Australian venue and also looking into the possibility of expanding the tournament. In February 2013, the changes to the tournament were gaining momentum with the NRL and Super League agreeing to begin alternating the World Club Challenge tournament between the UK and Australia. These changes were finally confirmed in November 2013, with both parties agreeing that the 2014 World Club Challenge would be the first held in Australia since 1994. In addition, commencing in 2015, the tournament would also be expanded to six teams. The World Club Challenge return to Australia in 2014 was a success with a solid crowd numbers of over 31,000, with the Sydney Roosters defeating the Wigan Warriors 36–14. During the game, Sydney's Michael Jennings became the first player to score a hat trick of tries in a World Club Challenge.

2015–2017: World Club Series

In September 2014 it was announced that the World Club Challenge name would be changed to the World Club Series with six clubs participating – 3 from each league. The first iteration took place between 20 and 22 February 2015, and featured three matches, the first and second essentially being two exhibition games and the final game being for the Championship trophy between the two respective premiers as in previous years.

In October 2017 it was suggested that the 2018 Series could be scrapped completely based on the top Australian teams reluctance to travel to the UK for the 2017 series which resulted in the Series being scaled back to two games only. In particular the second game of the 2017 series only featured an invited team from the NRL. In addition, the 2017 Rugby League World Cup being played in Australia at the end of 2017, meant that the preseasons for Australian teams was going to be unusually short ahead of the 2018 season and therefore did not want to make the trip to England for the 2018 series. The Melbourne Storm (2017 NRL Premiers) in particular, were reluctant to travel meaning the series was in danger of cancellation for the first time since the 1990s as it is the Storm that was playing in the World Club Challenge.

In June 2017, the Super League announced that the Australian city of Wollongong would host the first ever Super League game outside Europe. Wigan Warriors will "host" Hull F.C. in the game at WIN Stadium on Saturday, 10 February. In addition and as part of this trip to Australia, Wigan and Hull would also play two exhibition games against South Sydney Rabbitohs and St George Illawarra Dragons respectively. These were separately arranged fixtures and not considered part of the World Club Series.

2018–2020: Return to single match format

On 14 November 2017, it was confirmed that Leeds Rhinos would travel to Australia to play Melbourne Storm at AAMI Park in Melbourne on 16 February 2018, and that the World Club Challenge would return to a one-game format for the first time since 2014. The Storm defeated Leeds 38–4 to become World Club Champions for 2018 and also became the first club to hold the NRL Minor Premiership, NRL Premiership and World Club Challenege at the same time since the Sydney Roosters in 2014.

On 22 February 2020, the Sydney Roosters became the first team to win back to back World Club Challenges, defeating St Helens 20–12 in the process. They also overtook Wigan in most challenges won with five.

2021–2022: COVID-19 cancellations
On 20 November 2020 it was announced that the 2021 World Club challenge, which was due to be played between Melbourne Storm and St Helens would be postponed until late in 2021 owing to the push back of seasons due to the COVID-19 pandemic and the ongoing pandemic itself preventing overseas travel. However, due to the continuing issues surrounding the COVID-19 pandemic, the clash between St Helens and Melbourne was completely cancelled.

In October 2021, St Helens chairman Eamonn McManus said that while he hoped the 2022 version of this fixture could go ahead against the Penrith Panthers, he acknowledged it would be “very difficult” to arrange. The year's competition was ultimately also cancelled.

2023: Return
On 9 November 2022 it was announced that the World club challenge would make its return and be staged in Australia at BlueBet Stadium. Back-to-back NRL champions Penrith Panthers would host St Helens, the Super League champions for four consecutive years. The match took place on Saturday February 18, with kick-off at 7am (GMT). For the first time in the history of the competition the match went to golden point extra time after a dramatic finale meant that the match was tied 12–12 at the full time hooter. St Helens scored the winning point with a Lewis Dodd drop goal, a shock win to become the first Super League side to win the Challenge in Australia since 1994.

Results

List of Finals
18 teams have competed in the World Club Challenge with 12 teams being successful and being crowned world champions. Sydney Roosters have currently won more finals than any other team with 5 (Roosters first title was prior to the club's name change from Eastern Suburbs).

Team Performance

Wins by Competition

The Treble
The Treble, in Australian rugby league, involves winning the World Club Challenge, Grand Final, and Minor Premiership within the same season.

NB: In British rugby league, "the treble" refers to winning the Super League Grand Final, League Leaders Shield, and Challenge Cup, however British teams are still listed here who qualify by the Australian definition.

To date the teams that have held the three titles at once are as follows:

Venues

Attendance

Highest

Lowest

Records

Sponsors
The World Club Challenge has been sponsored sporadically since its formation.

Notes

References

 
Multi-national professional sports leagues